New Scotland Yard, formerly known as the Curtis Green Building and before that as Whitehall Police Station, is a building in Westminster, London. Since November 2016, it has been the Scotland Yard headquarters of the Metropolitan Police Service (MPS), the fourth such premises since the force's foundation in 1829. It is located on the Victoria Embankment and is situated within the Whitehall Conservation Area. It neighbours the Norman Shaw and Ministry of Defence buildings, together with Richmond House and Portcullis House. 

The New Scotland Yard building was designed in 1935 by the English architect William Curtis Green, who was commissioned to build an annexe to the existing Norman Shaw North building, which had been the Metropolitan Police's headquarters since 1890. Together with the Norman Shaw South building, the three sites were split off in 1967, with the Norman Shaw buildings being taken over by the British Government and the Curtis Green annexe being retained by the police. The earlier annexe, built at the rear of the Norman Shaw South building in 1898 by the Met's surveyor and principal architect John Dixon Butler, was retained as a police station and used operationally until 1992. 

In 2013, as a result of an estate reorganisation, the former "New Scotland Yard" in the neighbouring Broadway was sold and the force headquarters was relocated to the Curtis Green Building after extensive renovations. It was renamed New Scotland Yard in 2016.

History

The stone-fronted, stripped classical building was designed by the English architect William Curtis Green. Construction started in 1935 and finished five years later. The building was constructed as a third building and an extension to the then–New Scotland Yard building, which consisted of two buildings that had been completed in 1890 and 1906, which were connected by a bridge. The two structures are now known as the Norman Shaw Buildings. The earlier annexe, built at the rear of the Norman Shaw South building in 1898 by the Met's surveyor and principal architect John Dixon Butler, was retained as a police station and used operationally until 1992.

The Curtis Green Building served as part of the Met's three-building headquarters during the Second World War and housed the forensics and technology departments. In 1967, the force relocated its main headquarters to 10 Broadway and sold the two Norman Shaw buildings to the British Government. The Curtis Green Building, however, remained a police building and became a sub-HQ for the force's territorial department until 2010.

In 2013 it was announced by the Met that its headquarters would be relocated from 10 Broadway to the Curtis Green Building as part of the force's drive to reduce costs. The building was redesigned and extended in a multi-million pound redevelopment during 2015–2016. It was renamed "New Scotland Yard". The refurbishment contract was awarded to Allford Hall Monaghan Morris and the project was engineered by Arup and the project's costs were managed by Arcadis; construction responsibilities were undertaken by the Royal BAM Group. The MPS retained the "New Scotland Yard" revolving sign and moved it, along with the Crime Museum, to the new site.

References

Sources

External links
 
 Metropolitan Police Branches
 Blumberg, Jess. "A Brief History of Scotland Yard", Smithsonian.com, 28 September 2007.

1935 establishments in England
Buildings and structures in the City of Westminster
Metropolitan Police administrative buildings
Police headquarters
Stripped Classical architecture